The Bragadin-class submarines were built for the  (Royal Italian Navy) during the late 1920s. Both boats participated in the Second World War and were discarded in 1948.

Design and description
The Bragadin-class submarines were essentially minelaying versions of the earlier . They shared that class's problems with stability and had to be modified to correct those problems after completion. They displaced  surfaced and  submerged. In 1935 the stern was shortened and the boats were bulged to improve their stability. Their crew numbered 56 officers and enlisted men.

For surface running, the boats were powered by two  diesel engines, each driving one propeller shaft. When submerged each propeller was driven by a  electric motor. They could reach  on the surface and  underwater.

The boats were armed with four internal  torpedo tubes in the bow for which they carried six torpedoes. In the stern were two tubes which could accommodate a total of 16 or 24 naval mines, depending on the type. They were also armed with one  deck gun for combat on the surface. Their anti-aircraft armament consisted of two  machine guns.

Boats

References

Bibliography

External links
 Sommergibili Marina Militare website

Submarine classes
 Bragadin
Submarines of the Regia Marina